Gordon Stanley Clinton (April 13, 1920 – November 19, 2011) was the 43rd mayor of Seattle. After defeating incumbent Mayor Allen Pomeroy in a close election in 1956, Clinton served two terms, from 1956 to 1964. Upon taking office, Clinton established the Metropolitan Problems Advisory Committee, headed by local community leader John Ellis, to suggest approaches to dealing with chronic local and regional problems. During his administration, Clinton tackled issues as divergent as regional governance, international trade, and discrimination in housing. He was a Republican.

Clinton actively supported development of enabling legislation used by the Washington State Legislature to allow creation of regional governments, leading to the formation of the Municipality of Metropolitan Seattle (Metro) in 1958. Clinton also established Seattle's first sister city relationship (with Kobe, Japan) in 1956, supported the development of the current Seattle Center site for the World's Fair in 1962, and fought illegal gambling in Seattle. In 1963, Clinton created the 12-member Seattle Human Rights Commission to promote equality and understanding among Seattle residents.

References

External links 
 Gordon S. Clinton at historylink.org
 Guide to the Mayor Gordon Stanley Clinton Photographs 1959
 Guide to the Mayor Gordon Clinton Election Scrapbooks 1956–1960
Political Graveyard

1920 births
2011 deaths
Mayors of Seattle
Methodists from Washington (state)
Washington (state) Republicans